Santanu Bhattacharya is the Chief Technologist of NatWest Group, a visiting professor at Indian Institute of Science. and a collaborating scientist at the Camera Culture Group, MIT Media Lab. He is a serial entrepreneur and has worked for NASA and Facebook in the past.

Early life 
Santanu was born in the remote sub-Himalayan part of Northeast India. After graduating high-school, he studied at Indian Institute of Technology Bombay before moving to the United States for graduate school.

Career 
Santanu received his PhD from University of Maryland, College Park and NASA Goddard Space Flight Center where he published several papers on a new class of superconducting infrared detectors.

Following the academic experience, Santanu pursued an entrepreneurial path in data and automation at OriginLab. Santanu then led LIMS product development at Beckman Instruments and AT Kearney to pursue management consulting with several marquee clients such as Gillette, Pepsi, BMW and Goldman Sachs.

In 2004 he joined AOL-Time Warner, then a leading internet company where the B2C internet users spend most time every day. Santanu led the creation of the Analytics Solution Centre, a global team of over 200 data scientists, online advertising experts and engineers who build foundational technologies around AOL’s contextual and behavioural advertising targeting platforms.

In 2008, Santanu started Salorix, a Silicon Valley based startup, to build an AI platform to help global brands find the social media updates that are worth responding to, a "needle in a haystack" problem. Salorix’s flagship product Amplfy enabled global brands to monetize social media campaigns by analyzing real-time social conversations and ranking the most effective engaging audience.

In 2014, he joined Facebook where he led Emerging Market Products functions that used data-driven technology to build new products for emerging user growth.

From 2015-2017, Santanu served as Senior Vice President, Technology and Products at Delhivery India’s largest third-party eCommerce logistics that went IPO in 2022. In 2018, he was appointed as the Chief Data Scientist of Airtel, world’s second largest telco with 450 million subscribers in 18 countries.

"India Class" Data Problems 
At the 2020 World Economic Forum in Davos, Santanu talked about his philosophy of solving "India Class" data problems that serve as a template for the rest of the world. According to his talks and writings on the topic, "India Class" problems are defined as being at the crossroad of exploding amount of private data (unstructured, incomplete, incorrect), nascent consumer behaviour with "switchers" who exchange or try out others phones, apps, expectations for software or services being free and relatively limited amount of public data on addresses, population, migration, income etc.

COVID-19 and Data Science 
The rapid growth of COVID-19 led to an unprecedented response globally. Santanu was appointed as a member of the COVID-19 Mobility Data Network at Harvard University to "provide daily updates to decision-makers at the state and local levels on how well social distancing interventions are working." The team consisted of infectious disease epidemiologists and scientists working in partnership with tech companies to use aggregated mobility data in support of the COVID-19 response.

References 

IIT Bombay alumni
Computer scientists
Academic staff of the Indian Institute of Science
MIT Sloan School of Management alumni
University System of Maryland alumni
Year of birth missing (living people)
Living people